Ramón Salazar Hoogers (born 28 May 1973) is a Spanish film director and screenwriter. He was nominated for the 2003 Goya Award for Best New Director for the film Stones. He was born in Málaga.

Selected filmography

References

External links
 

1973 births
Living people
People from Málaga
Spanish film directors